The Journal of the British Dragonfly Society is a scientific journal published twice-yearly by the British Dragonfly Society since 1983. It contains material relevant to Odonata recorded from the United Kingdom. The editor-in-chief is P. J. Mill.

Abstracting and indexing 
The journal is abstracted and indexed in The Zoological Record.

Further reading 
 Merritt, R., 1987. The origins and early history of the British Dragonfly Society. Journal of the British Dragonfly Society 3: 21–37.
 Corbet, P.S., 1993. The first ten years of the British Dragonfly Society. Journal of the British Dragonfly Society 9: 25–37.

References

External links 
 

Entomology journals and magazines
Publications established in 1983
Biannual journals
English-language journals
1983 establishments in the United Kingdom
Academic journals published by learned and professional societies of the United Kingdom